In statistics, an exchangeable sequence of random variables (also sometimes interchangeable) is a sequence X1, X2, X3, ... (which may be finitely or infinitely long) whose joint probability distribution does not change when the positions in the sequence in which finitely many of them appear are altered. Thus, for example the sequences

 

both have the same joint probability distribution.

It is closely related to the use of independent and identically distributed random variables in statistical models. Exchangeable sequences of random variables arise in cases of simple random sampling.

Definition 
Formally, an exchangeable sequence of random variables is a finite or infinite sequence X1, X2, X3, ... of random variables such that for any finite permutation σ of the indices 1, 2, 3, ..., (the permutation acts on only finitely many indices, with the rest fixed), the joint probability distribution of the permuted sequence

is the same as the joint probability distribution of the original sequence.

(A sequence E1, E2, E3, ... of events is said to be exchangeable precisely if the sequence of its indicator functions is exchangeable.)  The distribution function FX1,...,Xn(x1, ..., xn) of a finite sequence of exchangeable random variables is symmetric in its arguments   Olav Kallenberg provided an appropriate definition of exchangeability for continuous-time stochastic processes.

History 
The concept was introduced by William Ernest Johnson in his 1924 book Logic, Part III: The Logical Foundations of Science. Exchangeability is equivalent to the concept of statistical control introduced by Walter Shewhart also in 1924.

Exchangeability and the i.i.d. statistical model 

The property of exchangeability is closely related to the use of independent and identically distributed (i.i.d.) random variables in statistical models.  A sequence of random variables that are i.i.d, conditional on some underlying distributional form, is exchangeable.  This follows directly from the structure of the joint probability distribution generated by the i.i.d. form.

Mixtures of exchangeable sequences (in particular, sequences of i.i.d. variables) are exchangeable.   The converse can be established for infinite sequences, through an important representation theorem by Bruno de Finetti (later extended by other probability theorists such as Halmos and Savage).  The extended versions of the theorem show that in any infinite sequence of exchangeable random variables, the random variables are conditionally independent and identically-distributed, given the underlying distributional form.  This theorem is stated briefly below.  (De Finetti's original theorem only showed this to be true for random indicator variables, but this was later extended to encompass all sequences of random variables.)  Another way of putting this is that de Finetti's theorem characterizes exchangeable sequences as mixtures of i.i.d. sequences — while an exchangeable sequence need not itself be unconditionally i.i.d., it can be expressed as a mixture of underlying i.i.d. sequences.

This means that infinite sequences of exchangeable random variables can be regarded equivalently as sequences of conditionally i.i.d. random variables, based on some underlying distributional form.  (Note that this equivalence does not quite hold for finite exchangeability.  However, for finite vectors of random variables there is a close approximation to the i.i.d. model.)  An infinite exchangeable sequence is strictly stationary and so a law of large numbers in the form of Birkhoff–Khinchin theorem applies.  This means that the underlying distribution can be given an operational interpretation as the limiting empirical distribution of the sequence of values.  The close relationship between exchangeable sequences of random variables and the i.i.d. form means that the latter can be justified on the basis of infinite exchangeability.  This notion is central to Bruno de Finetti's development of predictive inference and to Bayesian statistics.  It can also be shown to be a useful foundational assumption in frequentist statistics and to link the two paradigms.

The representation theorem: This statement is based on the presentation in O'Neill (2009) in references below.  Given an infinite sequence of random variables  we define the limiting empirical distribution function  by:

(This is the Cesaro limit of the indicator functions.  In cases where the Cesaro limit does not exist this function can actually be defined as the Banach limit of the indicator functions, which is an extension of this limit.  This latter limit always exists for sums of indicator functions, so that the empirical distribution is always well-defined.) This means that for any vector of random variables in the sequence we have joint distribution function given by:

If the distribution function  is indexed by another parameter  then (with densities appropriately defined) we have:

These equations show the joint distribution or density characterised as a mixture distribution based on the underlying limiting empirical distribution (or a parameter indexing this distribution).

Note that not all finite exchangeable sequences are mixtures of i.i.d. To see this, consider sampling without replacement from a finite set until no elements are left. The resulting sequence is exchangeable, but not a mixture of i.i.d. Indeed, conditioned on all other elements in the sequence, the remaining element is known.

Covariance and correlation 

Exchangeable sequences have some basic covariance and correlation properties which mean that they are generally positively correlated.  For infinite sequences of exchangeable random variables, the covariance between the random variables is equal to the variance of the mean of the underlying distribution function.  For finite exchangeable sequences the covariance is also a fixed value which does not depend on the particular random variables in the sequence.  There is a weaker lower bound than for infinite exchangeability and it is possible for negative correlation to exist.

Covariance for exchangeable sequences (infinite): If the sequence  is exchangeable then:

 

Covariance for exchangeable sequences (finite): If  is exchangeable with  then:

 

The finite sequence result may be proved as follows.  Using the fact that the values are exchangeable we have:

 

We can then solve the inequality for the covariance yielding the stated lower bound.  The non-negativity of the covariance for the infinite sequence can then be obtained as a limiting result from this finite sequence result.

Equality of the lower bound for finite sequences is achieved in a simple urn model: An urn contains 1 red marble and n − 1 green marbles, and these are sampled without replacement until the urn is empty.  Let Xi = 1 if the red marble is drawn on the i-th trial and 0 otherwise.  A finite sequence that achieves the lower covariance bound cannot be extended to a longer exchangeable sequence.

Examples 
 Any convex combination or mixture distribution of iid sequences of random variables is exchangeable.  A converse proposition is de Finetti's theorem.
 Suppose an urn contains n red and m blue marbles.  Suppose marbles are drawn without replacement until the urn is empty.  Let Xi be the indicator random variable of the event that the i-th marble drawn is red.  Then {Xi}i=1,...n+m is an exchangeable sequence.  This sequence cannot be extended to any longer exchangeable sequence.
 Let  have a bivariate normal distribution with parameters ,  and an arbitrary correlation coefficient . The density function is

Applications 

Partition the sequence into non-overlapping pairs: if the two elements of the pair are equal (00 or 11), discard it; if the two elements of the pair are unequal (01 or 10), keep the first.

Exchangeable random variables arise in the study of U statistics, particularly in the Hoeffding decomposition.

See also
 Resampling
 , statistical tests based on exchanging between groups
 U-statistic

Notes

Bibliography 
 Aldous, David J., Exchangeability and related topics, in: École d'Été de Probabilités de Saint-Flour XIII — 1983, Lecture Notes in Math. 1117, pp. 1–198, Springer, Berlin, 1985.  
 Barlow, R. E. & Irony, T. Z. (1992) "Foundations of statistical quality control" in Ghosh, M. & Pathak, P.K. (eds.) Current Issues in Statistical Inference: Essays in Honor of D. Basu, Hayward, CA: Institute of Mathematical Statistics, 99-112.
 Bergman, B. (2009) "Conceptualistic Pragmatism: A framework for Bayesian analysis?", IIE Transactions, 41, 86–93
 
 Chow, Yuan Shih and Teicher, Henry, Probability theory. Independence, interchangeability, martingales, Springer Texts in Statistics, 3rd ed., Springer, New York, 1997. xxii+488 pp. 
 
 Kallenberg, O., Probabilistic symmetries and invariance principles. Springer-Verlag, New York (2005). 510 pp. .
 Kingman, J. F. C., Uses of exchangeability, Ann. Probability 6 (1978) 83–197  
 O'Neill, B. (2009) Exchangeability, Correlation and Bayes' Effect. International Statistical Review 77(2), pp. 241–250.  
 
 Zabell, S. L. (1988) "Symmetry and its discontents", in Skyrms, B. & Harper, W. L. Causation, Chance and Credence, pp''155-190, Kluwer 
 

Statistical randomness
Types of probability distributions